Lithocupes is an extinct genus of beetles in the family Ommatidae, known from the Carnian Madygen Formation of Kyrgyzstan containing the following species:

 Lithocupes gigas Ponomarenko, 1969
 Lithocupes incertus Ponomarenko, 1966
 Lithocupes punctatus Ponomarenko, 1969

References

Ommatidae
Carnian genera
Fossils of Kyrgyzstan
Madygen Formation
Prehistoric beetle genera